Mulondo Sekajja was Kabaka of the Kingdom of Buganda between 1555 and 1564. He was the 9th Kabaka of Buganda.

Claim to the throne
He was the eldest surviving son of Kabaka Nakibinge Kagali, Kabaka of Buganda, who reigned between 1524 and 1554. His mother was Nabakyaala Namulondo, the fourth wife of his father and the Naabagereka. He was elected to succeed his father, upon his father's death and after the regency of his step-mother expired on the birth of her daughter in 1555. He established his capital at Mitw'ebiri Hill.

Historian Semakula Kiwanuka asserts that the reign of Mulondo might be an indication of the beginning of a new dynasty. 

During his reign, Mulondo led several raids against Buddu, which was then still part of the Bunyoro-Kitara kingdom.

Married life
He married as his only wife, Nakku, daughter of Naserenga, of the Ffumbe clan.

Issue
He fathered three sons, by his wife, Nakku of the Ffumbe clan:

 Prince (Omulangira) Kazibwe
 Prince (Omulangira) Walugembe
 Kabaka Sekamaanya Kisolo, Kabaka of Buganda

The final years
He died at the Kiryokyembi Palace, in Mitw'ebiri. He is buried at Gombe, in Bulemeezi County. Other credible sources place his burial place at Bulondo Busiro.

Succession table

See also
 Kabaka of Buganda

References

External links
List of the Kings of Buganda

Kabakas of Buganda
16th-century African people